Dəyirmanyanı is a village in the Lachin Rayon of Azerbaijan.

References

Villages in Azerbaijan
Populated places in Lachin District